Robbinsdale Armstrong High School (full name Robbinsdale Neil A. Armstrong Senior High School) (abbr. AHS) is located in Plymouth, Minnesota, just outside Minneapolis. The school serves students from the cities of Robbinsdale, Crystal, New Hope, Plymouth and Golden Valley.

The school offers core subjects as well as technology education, physical education, and the fine arts.  Newsweek ranked the school 1324.
In their "List of the 1500 Top High Schools in America," and The Washington Post ranked AHS as #11 in Minnesota. Armstrong, along with the Robbinsdale Area School District, have also been ranked among the "100 Best Communities for Music Education" by the American Music Conference.

The school's athletic programs have made it to state competitions on many occasions. School tradition maintains that the school's rival is Robbinsdale Cooper. Together, Robbinsdale Armstrong and Robbinsdale Cooper serve the secondary school population of over 4000 students in the district.

The students 
Armstrong is a four-year public high school located in Plymouth, Minnesota and it is one of two public high schools in the district, along with Robbinsdale Cooper High School.  As of the 2015–2016 school year, Armstrong has about a student population of 2005. About 41% of students are students of color.

Facilities 

Robbinsdale Armstrong High School was built in 1969, and it has undergone several renovations and upgrades since its construction, with the most recent major renovation finished in 2003. The campus consists of four interconnected buildings with four stories. The grounds contain a varsity and a junior varsity football field. In addition, Armstrong has two baseball fields, several enclosed tennis courts, and a track going around the football field.

Athletics and activities 
Armstrong was once a member of the Classic Lake Conference; however, it was voted out of the conference due to declining enrollment as of 2010, thus Armstrong was admitted to the Northwest Suburban Conference.

The Falcons rivalries include the Cooper Hawks, Hopkins Royals, and the Wayzata Trojans.

Notable alumni 
 Mo Collins, comedian
 Tom Dooher, former president, Education Minnesota, largest union in Minnesota
 David Gilreath, professional football player with the Buffalo Bills
 Chad Hartman, Current WCCO radio host, Former KFAN radio host and son of Star Tribune reporter Sid Hartman
 Ember Reichgott Junge, former politician
 Evan Kaufmann (born 1984), professional ice hockey player in Germany
Douglas McCain, Jihadist, killed in Syria.
 Mark Merila, professional baseball player
 Everette Pedescleaux, professional football player for the Denver Broncos
 Derek Peltier, professional hockey player
 Todd Richards, former hockey player and former coach of the Minnesota Wild and the Columbus Blue Jackets
 Travis Richards, former hockey player for the University of Minnesota
 Jeff Schuh, All-Big Ten First Team, University of Minnesota (1980), professional football player for Cincinnati Bengals (1981–85), Green Bay Packers (1986), Minnesota Vikings (1986)
 Leah Thorvilson, distance runner
 Bee Vang, actor (played Thao Vang Lor in Clint Eastwood's Gran Torino)
 Ryan Bauer-Walsh,  American actor, singer, and visual artist
 Dennis Vaske, professional hockey player
 Jordan Leopold, – National Hockey League Member of U.S. Olympic hockey team and the NHL's Minnesota Wild.

References

External links 

 

Public high schools in Minnesota
Educational institutions established in 1970
Schools in Hennepin County, Minnesota
School buildings completed in 1970